Burt Wolf: Travels and Traditions or Travels & Traditions is a television series hosted by Burt Wolf. The series began airing in 2000 and is currently in its 18th season.

Episodes

Travels & Traditions I
101 Munich, Germany
102 Greater Miami & The Beaches
103 Baja: The Sea of Cortez
104 Brussels, Belgium
105 Asheville, North Carolina
106 Trondheim, Norway
107 Tampa Bay, Florida
108 Richmond, Virginia
109 Naples, Florida
110 The New Hong Kong
111 Las Vegas
112 Bermuda
113 Trieste, Italy

Travels & Traditions II
201 The Basque Country of Northern Spain
202 Curaçao
203 The Twin Cities
204 Central Switzerland
205 San Francisco
206 Beaver Creek
207 Napa Valley
208 Miami
209 Philadelphia
210 Springfield
211 Ottawa
212 Manhattan
213 Ellis Island

Travels & Traditions III
301 Oaxaca, Mexico
302 Sacramento, California
303 Sonoma, California
304 California's Gold Country
305 Zurich, Switzerland
306 Getting Ready for Christmas at Biltmore Estate
307 Celebrating Christmas at Biltmore Estate
308 U.S. Virgin Islands
309 Lake Geneva Region, Switzerland
310 Geneva, Switzerland
311 Ticino, Switzerland
312 Northwestern Switzerland
313 The Swiss Mittelland
314 The Matterhorn Region
315 Graubuenden

Travels & Traditions IV
401 Boston, Massachusetts
402 Winter in Lake Geneva Region, Switzerland
403 Winter in Valais, Switzerland
404 Yucatán, Mexico
405 Eastern Switzerland
406 Jungfrau Region, Switzerland

Travels & Traditions V
501 Taiwan
502 The Shrine at Guadalupe
503 Taipei
504 Mexico City
505 The History and Science of Shopping
506 The Future of Shopping
507 The Shrine at Czestochowa, Poland
508 Southwestern France
509 Kraków, Poland
510 The Shrine at Lourdes, France

Travels & Traditions VI
600 Vatican City & The Papacy
601 Atlantic City, New Jersey
602 Dublin, Ireland
603 The Land Of St. Patrick
604 Austrian Monasteries
605 On Pilgrimage To Santiago
606 Santiago De Compostela, Spain
607 Siena, Italy
608 Assisi, Italy
609 Stamp Collecting, China
610 Chimayo, New Mexico

Travels & Traditions VII
701 Santa Fe, New Mexico
702 Christmas In Vienna, Austria
703 Vatican City, Rome
704 Cologne, Germany
705 Aachen, Germany
706 Hamburg, Germany
707 St. Gallen, Switzerland
708 A Tuscan Harvest, Italy
709 Taiwan, A Sense Of Place I
710 Taiwan, A Sense Of Place II

Travels & Traditions VIII
801 Cruising The Danube
802 Milan, Italy
803 Going Platinum
804 Rome, Italy
805 What's Cooking In Switzerland
806 Holland
807 Alaska
808 Hong Kong
809 Immigrating To America, I
810 Immigrating To America, II

Travels & Traditions IX
901 Cruising Holland & Belgium
902 Islands Of Bermuda
903 Cruising The Rhine
904 Cruising France
905 Gateway To Scotland
906 Cruising The Netherlands
907 The Grand Bahamas
908 Cruising Provence
909 Cayman Islands
910 Great Hotels Of The World

Travels & Traditions X
1001 Great Hotels Of the World PART 2
1002 New York City
1003 Philadelphia, PA
1004 Chicago, IL
1005 Napa Valley, CA
1006 The Basque Region, Spain
1007 Miami, FL
1008 Belgium
1009 San Francisco, CA
1010 Springfield, IL

Travels & Traditions XI
1101 Luzern, Switzerland
1102 Touring Ireland
1103 Burt Wolf's Family Vacation
1104 German Immigration to the US
1105 What are they Eating in the Photograph
1106 Taiwan A Sense of Place Part Three, Nurture vs. Nature
1107 Taiwan A Sense of Place Part Four, Nurture vs. Nature
1108 Connecting the Dots in America

Travels & Traditions XII
1201 Atlantic Crossing
1202 Amsterdam To Cologne
1203 Cologne To Zell
1204 Cochem To Luxembourg
1205 Artcops
1206 Nuremberg To Linz
1207 Melk To Budapest
1208 Lyon To Arles

Travels & Traditions XIII
1301 Venice, Italy
1302 Florence, Italy
1303 What's Cooking in Rome
1304 Assisi & Siena, Italy
1305 Lucerne, Switzerland
1306 Cruising the Adriatic

Travels & Traditions XIV
1401 Hong Kong, Part 1
1402 Hong Kong, Part 2
1403 Cruising the Rhine, Part 1
1404 Cruising the Rhine, Part 2
1405 Sailing the Danube
1406 The Palm Beaches

Travels & Traditions XV
1501 Basking With The Basques
1502 Coming To America
1503 Nature vs Nurture
1504 Women At Work
1505 The Girl With The Book
1506 It’s A Good Thing

Travels & Traditions XVI
1601 Kansas City
1602 Guatemala, Part 1
1603 Guatemala, Part 2
1604 Have a Healthy Trip
1605 St. Augustine, Florida
1606 Tea for Two
1607 Cruising the Baltic
1608 The Road To Ruin
1609 Visiting a Great Museum
1610 On The Road In America, Pt 1
1611 On The Road In America, Pt 2
1612 On The Road In America, Pt 3

Travels & Traditions XVII
1701 Making of a Restaurant, Part 1
1702 Making of a Restaurant, Part 2
1703 The Beach Vacation, Part 1
1704 The Beach Vacation, Part 2
1705 Volunteer Tourism, Part 1
1706 Volunteer Tourism, Part 2
1707 Do The Right Thing
1708 Kansas City Part, 2

Travels & Traditions XVIII
1801 Gone Fishing, Part 1
1802 Gone Fishing, Part 2
1803 History of Chocolate, Part 1
1804 History of Chocolate, Part 2
1805 History of Water
1806 The Future of Water
1807 Great Art Undiscovered
1808 How To Sell The Art You Create
1809 Short Guide To Cell Phone Safety
1810 Travel & The Danger Of RF Radiation
1811 China Ancient and Modern
1812 Mapping Business in China

References

External links

PBS original programming
2000 American television series debuts
2010s American television series